Hasanamapet aka Hasanamapettai is a village situated at Vembakkam Taluk in Tiruvannamalai district. A 25 km road trip from Kanchipuram in the Kanchipuram-Cheyyar road. The village was formerly known as Deivanthangal.

Falls under Cheyyar assembly constituency and Arni parliament constituency. There is a big proud story in the naming reason of this village. Hasan + Ammal + Pettai, where Hasan is a Muslim female name, amma is a Tamil word to mention mother and pettai is the Tamil word to mention a small area. It is believed that this particular village land was donated by Hasan to the people and hence to honour her the name was changed as Hasanamapettai.

Even now the people offer the first respect and prayers to Hasan in her memorial situated in the southwest end of this village and then only they offer their prayers to their Gods.

Most of this traditional village's residents are Silk saree manufacturers. The world-famous Kanchipuram silk sarees are crafted by the weavers of Hasanamapettai.

This village has a high literacy rate.

This village has good infrastructure with wide and clean streets, water taps, solar lamps, etc.

Every street has a temple and a total of 13 streets are there in this beautiful village. The ten-day Angala amman festival is famous along with the Oonjal sevai on every no moon day. The seventh and tenth days of the festival are major events.

Apart from that, the Soorasamharam in Arulmigu Parvadhavarthini Samedha Ramanathaeswarar temple is a week of fun. It is believed that the procedures they follow in this festival is great even than Tiruchendur Soorasamharam. Once in a while the 20-day Mahabharata festival is also conducted.

The beauty of these festivals resides in how people contribute for it. All the citizens of this village, pay their fixed share and also volunteers donate additional money towards these festivals. The arrangers and all the work is completely managed and shared by these village people on a rotating basis.

There is a matriculation school and a government school to build the basics for the kids of this village.

Youths do charity works, pongal celebration, Independence Day and Republic Day celebrations.

Villages in Tiruvannamalai district